Apex Friendship High School, often referred to as AFHS, is a public high school located in the southwestern corner of Apex, North Carolina near the small community of Friendship, North Carolina. The school was founded in 2015 and is part of the Wake County Public School System.

History

School name 
The naming of Apex Friendship High School was highly controversial before its opening in 2015. The school board had initially planned to call the school West Apex High School after a vote in 2011, but local Friendship residents, many of whom are minorities, wanted the school to pay tribute to the area's history by including the word ‘Friendship’ in its name. In 2013, the Wake County School Board retracted its 2011 decision, in favor of the current name Apex Friendship High School, to accommodate these residents’ wishes.

After the naming decision, the school board received criticism from many of the incoming students, parents, and staff. Some thought the name 'West Apex' would help students feel more connected, rather than the name Friendship. Others in favor of the name of 'Friendship' thought it would help acknowledge what the communities roots are. There were two online petitions with hundreds of signatures for each, but the ultimate decision by the school board set in place the name Apex Friendship High School.

Early years 
It opened for the 2015–2016 school year to ninth and tenth graders only. During the 2016–2017 school year it added 11th graders, and the following year expanded to add 12th graders.

References

External links 

Schools in Wake County, North Carolina
Public high schools in North Carolina
Educational institutions established in 2015
2015 establishments in North Carolina
Buildings and structures in Wake County, North Carolina